Feodor Lark  (born June 20, 1997) is a Russian-born former television actor, known for his role as Bridgette DuBois in the NBC/CBS television series Medium.

Personal life
Lark was born Maria Lark in Siberia, Russia on June 20, 1997. He was adopted by an American woman named Peggy Lark.

In May 2021, Lark came out as transgender on his social media accounts,
specified his pronouns as he/him, and revealed his new name, Feodor.

Career
Between 2005 and 2011, beginning at age 8, Lark played Bridgette DuBois, the middle child of the DuBois family, on the NBC/CBS television drama Medium, starring Patricia Arquette. On September 3, 2006, Lark became the youngest person ever to co-host ABC's The View.

In 2007, Lark made two appearances on The View. He appeared in a music video for the Norah Jones song, "Sunrise". Access Hollywood also chose Lark as their correspondent as well.

Filmography

Awards and nominations

References

External links

1997 births
Living people
21st-century Russian male actors
People from Siberia
Russian adoptees
Russian child actors
Russian television actors
Russian emigrants to the United States
Transgender male actors
Transgender men
Russian LGBT actors